Vladimír Novák (born 16 April 1948) is a Czech judoka. He competed in the men's heavyweight event at the 1976 Summer Olympics.

References

External links
 

1948 births
Living people
Czech male judoka
Olympic judoka of Czechoslovakia
Judoka at the 1976 Summer Olympics
People from Klatovy
Sportspeople from the Plzeň Region